List of streets in Bratislava is full list of streets in Bratislava assembled by official list of streets of Bratislava promulgated by Magistrát mesta Bratislavy.

References

Sources 
 Abecedný zoznam ulíc Bratislavy (verzia z 29.7.2013) (slovak)
 Poštové smerovacie čísla (slovak)

Bratislava
Streets in Bratislava
Bratislava